Jin Xin (born 4 September 1991) is a former Chinese footballer.

Club career 
Jin Xin started his professional career in 2010 when he was promoted to China League One side Hubei Luyin's first team squad. He made his senior debut on 21 August 2010, in a 1–0 away defeat against Yanbian FC, coming on as a substitute for Li Hang in the 87th minute. Jin was loaned to China League Two side Hubei China-Kyle in the 2012 season. He played a regular starter and made 24 appearances as Hubei China-Kyle won promotion to the second tier after finished runners-up in the league. Jin returned to Wuhan Zall (rename of Hubei Greenery) for the 2013 Chinese Super League campaign. On 1 July 2013, he made his Super League debut in a 4–1 home loss against Guangzhou Evergrande, coming on as a substitute for Zhou Heng in the 77th minute. Jin was loaned out to China League Two side Sichuan Leaders in 2014. He returned to Wuhan in the summer and was released in the end of the season.

Wuhan Hongxing–Jiangsu Suning brawl incident

Jin played for amateur football teams in Wuhan after he was released. On 11 May 2016, he was involved in an on-field brawl in the third round of 2016 Chinese FA Cup which Wuhan Hongxing played against Jiangsu Suning. He was ineligible to play for Wuhan Hongxing, but he used an eligible player's identity to play in this match. He also attacked Jiangsu Suning's players following the final whistle after Wuhan Hongxing lost 1–0 with a stoppage time goal. Jin received a life ban from football for his behaviour by the Chinese Football Association on 20 May 2016.

Career statistics

References 

Living people
1991 births
Association football defenders
Chinese footballers
Footballers from Wuhan
Wuhan F.C. players
Xinjiang Tianshan Leopard F.C. players
Chinese Super League players
China League One players
Zhongnan University of Economics and Law alumni
21st-century Chinese people